The 1934 Brisbane Rugby League season was the 26th season of Brisbane's semi-professional rugby league football competition. Six teams competed for the premiership, which culminated in Northern Suburbs defeating minor premiers Western Suburbs 7–4 in the final.

Ladder

Finals

References 

Rugby league in Brisbane
1934 in rugby league
1934 in Australian rugby league